Gurovka is a rural locality (a selo) in Starokamyshlinsky Selsoviet, Kushnarenkovsky District, Bashkortostan, Russia. The population was 76 as of 2010. There are 10 streets.

Geography 
Gurovka is located 31 km southeast of Kushnarenkovo (the district's administrative centre) by road. Starye Kamyshly is the nearest rural locality.

References 

Rural localities in Kushnarenkovsky District